Twin Rocks (also known as Expedit) is an unincorporated community in Cambria County, Pennsylvania, United States. Twin Rocks has a post office with ZIP code 15960.

References

Unincorporated communities in Cambria County, Pennsylvania
Unincorporated communities in Pennsylvania